Ely ( from tref, town + , River Ely) is a district and community in Cardiff, Wales. It is to the north of Cowbridge Road West. Caerau defines the boundary to the south as does River Ely to the east and in part to the north.

The Roman era
In Roman times, Ely was the site of a Roman villa, near the old racecourse. There is also thought to have been a Roman road near the site linking to Cardiff Roman Fort and eastwards to Newport.

19th century

In 1855, the first horse race took place at Ely Racecourse, which took over from the Great Heath racecourse.

The Ordnance Survey map from the early 1880s shows just how isolated the ancient Ely village was from the rest of Cardiff. Reports about travelling along the main road over Ely Common to Cardiff talk of potholes and no shelter and a terrible journey on foot. Most of Ely was still farmland feeding Cardiff's population. A railway station had only recently been constructed, and this gave the surrounding area further potential for mass housing development.

The 'Ely Industrial School' on Cowbridge Road East was home to orphaned children originally from Cardiff. It had been set up to accommodate "pauper children" from 1863. It was very much a product of the Victorian age, and workhouse mentality, increased social awareness and responsibility saw it closing in 1903 and converted to additional workhouse accommodation for adults (though never used for that purpose), known as Ely Lodge. The children lived in what became as Ely Homes. The school was demolished some years later and an infectious diseases isolation unit was built on the same site.

The land was once owned by the Earl of Plymouth, who dictated that alcohol may not be sold on the land. As a result, like other plots of land with similar conditions, the boundaries of the old estate can be approximated by the locations of public houses around the area.

To attract business from nearby areas, establishments would be built as close to it as possible without actually being in Ely (local establishments are actually in Caerau and Fairwater).

20th and 21st centuries

Ely's rapid expansion of housing began in the 1920s to provide 'homes fit for heroes' after World War I. This came with the construction of council houses to rehouse people from Cardiff's inner-city slums.

Ely Hospital was a large psychiatric hospital which was the subject of abuse allegations in the 1960s. The subsequent enquiry led to reforms to mental health provision throughout the National Health Service. The hospital closed in 1996.

Ely Racecourse had its grandstand destroyed in a fire in 1937 and was then closed in 1939.

The area is widely considered to be one of Cardiff's less desirable areas in terms of crime and standard of living. But the residents of Ely are keen to dispel this reputation, citing the fact it is a very large, close-knit community.

The area was scarred by rioting and petrol bombing in September 1991 when shops and houses were vandalised and burnt by angry mobs in the Ely Petrol Riots, one of several waves of rioting around that time which occurred nationally and resulted in extensive damage and casualties. Some of the buildings targeted in Ely have since been demolished under more recent redevelopment projects.

In June 1993, 45-year-old former steelworker Les Reed was beaten to death after he challenged a gang of youths on the estate after he and a friend witnessed them vandalising a bollard in the middle of a road. Three local youths were later found guilty of Mr Reed's murder and sentenced to life imprisonment, and a fourth was cleared of murder but found guilty of manslaughter and received a lesser sentence. Mr Reed's friend, Phillip Tull, was also attacked but survived. After the trial in March 1994, it was revealed that three of the gang had previous convictions for violence, including one gang member who had a conviction for wounding against Mr Reed's teenage son Martin in 1991. Around this time, The Independent reported that unemployment on the estate stood at more than 30% (at least three times in the national average) and there was an ongoing problem with car crime and gang warfare.

Transport
Cowbridge Road West (the A48) is the predominant road running through Ely as it runs on to Canton and Cardiff city centre to the east, and to Culverhouse Cross interchange to the west near the Western Cemetery. The parallel Grand Avenue links Cowbridge Road West to the northern estates of Ely.

Ely is served by Cardiff Bus services 17 and 18 (Capital City Red) which operate every 10 minutes from Wood Street in Cardiff city centre via Canton and Caerau. North Ely is also served by services 12 and 13 which terminate westbound at Culverhouse Cross and eastbound in Tremorfa. Cardiff Bus services 96, 101 and 102, First Cymru service X2 and Easyway service 322 also serve the area.

The nearest station is Waun-gron Park in Fairwater. Ely railway station, which closed in 1962, was on the South Wales Main Line.

Electoral ward

Ely is both an electoral ward, and a community of the City of Cardiff.  There is no community council for the area. The electoral ward of Ely falls within the parliamentary constituency of Cardiff West, and has been represented by Kevin Brennan MP, of the Labour Party, since 2001. It is bounded by Fairwater to the northwest; Caerau to the south (although some of Lower Ely is technically in the electoral ward of Caerau, as is Trelai (Ely) Park); Culverhouse Cross to the west; and the Vale of Glamorgan to the southwest.

All three council seats are safely held by the Labour Party, with one of the long-term representatives being former Council leader, Russell Goodway, though in 2004 when Labour lost the Council to the Liberal Democrats, Goodway retained his seat by only 62 votes.

The Ely electoral ward consists of the area north of Cowbridge Road West, while the Caerau electoral ward consists of the area south of Cowbridge Road West. However, a misconception is Caerau being a subsection of the Ely area.

Notable people
 Steve Andrews, the "Bard of Ely"; singer-songwriter, writer and journalist
 Shakin' Stevens, pop singer of the 1980s
 Steve Robinson, WBO featherweight boxer
 Ryan Giggs, Manchester United and Wales footballer
 Rosemary Joshua, opera soprano known for her performances in George Frideric Handel's operas
 Nicky Piper, super-middleweight and light-heavyweight boxer
 Danielle Lineker, actress and model
 Rakie Ayola, actress, raised in Ely

Amenities
Ely features several shopping parades. Two large supermarkets (Aldi and Farmfoods) are located just off Cowbridge Road West on nearby Treseder Way. Tesco Express and Vets4Pets are both on Cowbridge Road near the Western Leisure Centre. The area also has a large Lidl store, Home Bargains, and a small Lloyds Pharmacy on Caerau Lane. Many small shops and local businesses are notably on Wilson Road and Grand Avenue; a Greggs store can be found on both streets, and other chain stores are in the Caerau ward such as B&Q.

Public houses
There are two pubs in the area, the Highfields Inn in Caerau and the Culverhouse on Cowbridge Road West. There are numerous social clubs, such as Ely Social and Sports Club (near Ely bridge), the Ely Royal Air Force Association (on Riverside Terrace in Lower Ely), Glamorgan Wanderers RFC Clubhouse (home of Glamorgan Wanderers RFC), and Cardiff West End Social Club (near the bottom of Wilson Road.) The Jasmine Enterprise Centre is next to the Fire Station on Cowbridge Road West.

Education

Primary Schools in Ely:
 Windsor Clive Junior School on Grand Avenue
 Herbert Thompson School on Plymouthwood Road
 Hywel Dda Primary School on Cambria Road
 Saint Fagans Church in Wales Primary School on Drope Road
 Saint Francis RC Primary School on Wilson Road

High Schools in Ely:
 Cardiff West Community High School on Penally Road

Youth Centres in Ely:
North Ely YC on Pethybridge Road
Dusty Forge Project on Cowbridge Road West

References

External links
OpenStreetMap map of the Ely area. Includes schools, pubs, etc.
A Cardiff University insight into youth and rap culture in Ely
www.geograph.co.uk : photos of Ely and surrounding area

Districts of Cardiff
Communities in Cardiff